Lidsky Uyezd (Лидский уезд) was one of the subdivisions of the Vilna Governorate of the Russian Empire. It was situated in the southwestern part of the governorate. Its administrative centre was Lida.

Demographics
At the time of the Russian Empire Census of 1897, Lidsky Uyezd had a population of 205,767. Of these, 73.2% spoke Belarusian, 12.0% Yiddish, 8.6% Lithuanian, 4.7% Polish, 1.2% Russian, 0.1% Ukrainian and 0.1% German as their native language.

References

 
Uezds of Vilna Governorate
Vilna Governorate